Gerlev is a town in the Frederikssund Municipality in North Zealand, Denmark. It is located on Hornsherred, five kilometers south of Jægerspris and six kilometers southwest of Frederikssund. As of 2022, it has a population of 1,035.

References 

Cities and towns in the Capital Region of Denmark
Frederikssund Municipality